The Basketball Federation of Yugoslavia was a non-profit organization and the national sports governing body for basketball in Socialist Federal Republic of Yugoslavia. Until 1991, the organization has represented SFR Yugoslavia in FIBA and the men's and women's national basketball teams in the Yugoslav Olympic Committee.

After the dissolution of SFR Yugoslavia in 1992, the successor countries all set up their national federations meanwhile the Federal republic of Yugoslavia keep the National Federation until the dissolution of the State Union of Serbia & Montenegro in 2006.

Competitions 
Men's
 1st-tier league: Yugoslav First Federal Basketball League
 2nd-tier league: Yugoslav 1. B Federal Basketball League
 Cup tournament: Yugoslav Basketball Cup
Women's
 1st-tier league: Yugoslav Women's Basketball League
 Cup tournament: Yugoslav Women's Basketball Cup

National teams 
Men's
 Yugoslavia men's national basketball team
 Yugoslavia men's national under-19 basketball team
 Yugoslavia men's national under-18 basketball team
 Yugoslavia men's national under-16 basketball team
 Yugoslavia men's university basketball team
Women's
 Yugoslavia women's national basketball team
 Yugoslavia women's national under-19 basketball team
 Yugoslavia women's national under-18 basketball team
 Yugoslavia women's national under-16 basketball team
 Yugoslavia women's university basketball team

Separate national federations
After the dissolution of SFR Yugoslavia in 1991, five new countries were created: Bosnia and Herzegovina, Croatia, Macedonia, FR Yugoslavia (in 2003, renamed to Serbia and Montenegro) and Slovenia.

List of presidents
  (1948–1949)
  (1949–1950)
 Danilo Knežević (1950–1965)
 Radomir Šaper (1965–1973)
 Radoslav Savić (1973–1977)
 Vladimir Pezo (1977–1980)
 Božina Ćulafić (1980–1981)
 Mehmed Dobroćani (1981–1982)
 Vasil Tupurkovski (1982–1983)
 Petar Breznik (1983–1985)
 Nebojša Popović (1985–1987)
 Miodrag Babić (1987–1989)
 Uglješa Uzelac (1989–1991)

See also 
 Yugoslav basketball clubs in European competitions
 Adriatic League

External links
 Yugoslavia participation – FIBA archive
 Yugoslavia at fibaeurope.com

Yugo
Basketball in Yugoslavia
Sports governing bodies in Yugoslavia
Sports organizations established in 1948
1948 establishments in Yugoslavia